Congregation Emanuel is a Conservative synagogue in Statesville, North Carolina.  Built in 1891, it is the oldest house of worship in Statesville and the third oldest synagogue building in the state.

The synagogue is located near downtown Statesville and the campus of Mitchell Community College at 206 North Kelly Street.

History

Jews are documented as living in Statesville before the Civil War, but the number of families was small and they gathered for prayer in private homes until a formal congregation was organized in 1883.  Congregation Emanuel rented space for services in the Statesville Fireman's Hall for nine years before building a synagogue in 1891–2, at a time when Statesville had a sizeable Jewish population.

Architecture

The brick, gable-end-to-the-street,  Rundbogenstil building with its recessed, round-arch entrance and round-arch windows has suffered no major alterations in the century that it has served the Jewish community of Statesville.  It is one of fewer than a hundred nineteenth-century synagogue buildings still standing in the United States.

External links
 http://www.congregationemanuelnc.org/

References

German-American culture in North Carolina
German-Jewish culture in the United States
Synagogues completed in 1891
Synagogues in North Carolina
Buildings and structures in Iredell County, North Carolina
Conservative synagogues in the United States
Rundbogenstil synagogues